Zębice Wrocławskie railway station is a station in Zębice, Lower Silesian Voivodeship, Poland. Prior to World War II, the railway station constituted a building, destroyed due to war operations. After the war, the building was replaced by a metal shack.

The railway station was renovated in 2008.

Connections 

132 Bytom - Wrocław Główny

References 

Wrocław County
Railway stations in Lower Silesian Voivodeship
Railway stations in Poland opened in 1842